Karl Joseph Kuwasseg (1802, Trieste - 1877) was an Austrian painter of the 19th century, who moved to Paris in 1830 and took the French nationality in 1870.

Karl Joseph Kuwasseg was born in Trieste. He moved to Vienna where he worked in watercolors. He accompanied the Count of Schomburg on his travels through Europe and America.  There he produced several landscapes.

His brothers Joseph (born 1799) and Anton also became painters and lithographers, as did his son Charles Euphrasie Kuwasseg.

Notes

External links

1802 births
1877 deaths
Artists from Trieste
19th-century Austrian painters
19th-century Austrian male artists
Austrian male painters